Sri Mulavasam also spelled as Sreemoolavasam was a famous Buddhist temple and centre of pilgrimage on the south-western coast of India. The exact location of is Sri Mulavasam unknown. Some scholars locate it in northern parts of Kerala state whereas some at somewhere in the Alappuzha district between Ambalappuzha and Thrikkunnappuzha. At its inception, it was a Hinayana seat of learning which gradually turned into a Mahayana center, and later into a Hindu center.

According to the inscription in Paliyam copper plates, also known as Sreemoolavasam cheppedukal, date back to AD 929 (or AD 898), issued by Ay king Vikramaditya Varagunan, a huge number of land holdings were donated to the Sreemoolavasam (Thirumoolavadam), a Buddhist institution. It is also mentioned in the Mushika Vamsa of poet Athula. 

The discovery of an idol of bodhisattva Halahala Lokeswara by M. Foucher in Gandhara region with Sanskrit inscription "Dakshina Pathe Mulavasa Lokanatha" proves that Sri Mulavasam was a famous Buddhist pilgrim centre in ancient days. Local rulers are said to have protected this famous temple from the encroachment of the Arabian sea by strengthening the shore. The centre perished after 10th century AD by which time the famous Chudamanivarma Vihara came into existence at Nagapattinam.

Sreemoolavasam is also known as Sreemoola Ghosha Viharam in Sanskrit. It is believed to have been a university where Buddhist monks lived and studied. The first Sreemoolavasam is believed to have been taken by Arabian sea. Later another was established. It is believed that an idol of Avalokitesvara also known as known as Lokanathan and Sugathan was built there.

References

Further reading 
 Menon, A Sreedhara, A Survey Of Kerala History – Kerala (India) – 1967
 A social history of India by S. N. Sadasivan

Buddhist temples in India
Buddhist sites in Kerala
Religious buildings and structures in Alappuzha district